The Oklahoma Secretary of Education is a member of the Oklahoma Governor's Cabinet. The Secretary is appointed by the Governor, with the consent of the Oklahoma Senate, to serve at the pleasure of the Governor. The Secretary serves as the chief advisor to the Governor on public education issues and needs.

The 9th and current Secretary is Ryan Walters, having been appointed by Governor Kevin Stitt in 2020.

History
The position of Secretary of Education was established, along with the Oklahoma Governor's Cabinet, by the Executive Branch Reform Act of 1986. The Act directs the Secretary of Education to advise the Governor on public education policy and advise the state public education agencies on new policy as directed by the Governor.

Dual Position
Oklahoma state law allows for Cabinet Secretaries to serve concurrently as the head of a State agency in addition to their duties as a Cabinet Secretary. Historically, the Secretary of Education has not served in any such dual position.

Responsibilities
The Secretary of Education oversees the State's public education system. This includes elementary education, secondary education, vocational education and higher education. The Secretary is chiefly responsible for ensuring accountability and performance from the educational system. The Secretary also oversees all libraries in the State and is responsible for ensuring that teachers are appropriately prepared to perform their duties.

As of fiscal year 2011, the Secretary of Education oversees 1,128 full-time employees and is responsible for an annual budget of over $6 billion. Of that budget, only $209 million (or 3%) is spent on operating the various State agencies under the Secretary's supervision. The remaining $5.9 billion is used as payments to local education agencies, such as school districts and universities, to support their activities.

The Oklahoma Legislature has charged the Secretary with several duties and responsibilities:
 Overseeing the Oklahoma Office of Educational Quality and Accountability
 Monitor the efforts of the local school districts to comply with the State education standards
 Identify local school districts not making satisfactory progress toward compliance with State education standards and recommend appropriate corrective actions to the Oklahoma State Department of Education
 Develops and implements a standardized performance measure to gauge the performance of local school districts
 Review the progress and effectiveness of the Education Reform Act of 1990
 Analyze the revenues for all systems of education and the expenditure of common education revenue
 Implementation the Oklahoma Teacher Preparation Act
 Make recommendations to the Governor and Legislature on methods to achieve an aligned, seamless system from preschool through post-secondary education
 Submit recommendations regarding funding for education or statutory changes to the Speaker of the Oklahoma House of Representatives, the President Pro Tempore of the Oklahoma Senate, and the Governor of Oklahoma

Agencies overseen
The Secretary of Education oversees the following state entities:
Department of Education
Department of Career and Technology Education
Department of Libraries
Office of Educational Quality and Accountability
State Regents for Higher Education

Salary
The annual salary for the position of Secretary of Education set by State law at $65,000. Despite this, if the Secretary serves as the head of State agency, the Secretary receives the higher of the two salaries.

List of Secretaries

References

External links
 Members of the Governor's Cabinet

Education
Education, Secretary of